The 2021 Carlton Football Club season was the Carlton Football Club's 158th season of competition.

It was the club's men's team's 125th season as a member of the Australian Football League. The team finished 13th out of eighteen teams with an 8–14 record in the 2021 AFL season – two positions lower than in the 2020 season, ultimately resulting in the sacking of coach David Teague at the end of the season.

It was the club's women's team's fifth season as a member of the AFL Women's competition. The team narrowly missed the finals for the 2021 AFL Women's season, finishing 7th with a record of 5–4.

Individually, Carlton players won the leading goalkicker awards in both the men's and women's senior competitions: Harry McKay winning the Coleman Medal with 58 goals, and Darcy Vescio winning their second leading goalkicker award with a league record 16 goals.

The club also fielded its men's reserves team in the Victorian Football League for the first time since 2002, and fielded a women's team in the VFL Women's competition.

Club summary
The 2021 AFL season will be the 125th season of the VFL/AFL competition since its inception in 1897; and, having competed in every season, it will also be the 125th season contested by the Carlton Football Club. 

Contractually, Carlton's primary home ground will continue to be the Melbourne Cricket Ground, with many games also to have been played at Marvel Stadium, and traditional home ground Ikon Park to serve as the training and administrative base. The club fielded its women's team in the fifth season of the AFL Women's competition, and Ikon Park served as the home ground for AFL Women's matches. Restrictions associated with the ongoing COVID-19 pandemic meant that crowds were often restricted to well short of the grounds' maximum capacities.

Carlton terminated its alignment with the Northern Blues in the Victorian Football League in March 2020 as a cost-saving measure during the coronavirus pandemic; and will re-establish its reserves team for the first time since 2002, which will contest its fourth overall season in the VFL.

Car manufacturer Hyundai, which had been a major sponsor of the club continuously since 2008, continued its partnership with the club through the season. Airline Virgin Australia, which had upgraded from a secondary sponsor to a major sponsor during the 2017 season, but was struggling owing to the Covid-19 pandemic, continued as the second major sponsor until mid-season; they were then replaced as major sponsor by Great Southern Bank (just recently rebranded from Credit Union Australia), who took on the major co-partner role in a three year deal.

For the fourth consecutive season, the club set a new membership record, surpassing the 2020 total of 67,035 members on 1 February, and finishing with 81,302 members. The club became debt-free for the first time since financing the construction of Ikon Park's Legends' Stand in 1996, having cleared $7 million in debt since 2017, despite the impact of the COVID-19 pandemic. The club also ceased to accept financial assistance from the AFL.

Impact of the COVID-19 pandemic
The season was played during the second year of the COVID-19 pandemic. As the season began, Australia had largely settled into a paradigm of most states maintaining zero COVID-19 cases outside of their international travel quarantine systems; this allowed football games to be played in front of crowds, usually with reduced capacity, and unhindered interstate travel was permitted without quarantine. However, the different state governments often responded quickly to small numbers or even single virus cases being discovered in the community; this meant border restrictions or quarantine periods were at times re-introduced at short notice, impacting interstate travel for games; and, in some cases, that city- or state-wide lockdowns could be imposed within the impacted states, precluding football activities altogether.

Direct, short notice impact to Carlton's senior seasons as a result of the pandemic were:
During the Victorian 13–17 February snap lockdown, the women's team's Round 3 match was closed to spectators at one day's notice;
During the Victorian snap lockdown which began on 28 May, the men's team's departed Victoria three days ahead of its normal schedule for its Round 11 match against  in Sydney; the team then remained in Sydney for the following week and played its Round 12 home game there at the neutral Sydney Cricket Ground against  instead of at the Melbourne Cricket Ground.
As a result of Perth becoming a hot zone in late June, the men's team's away game against  was played at the Melbourne Cricket Ground.
Lockdowns and ongoing restrictions in Victoria saw men's matches from Round 18 onwards closed to spectators.

Senior personnel
Mark Lo Giudice continued in his final season as club president, a role he had held for a total of almost eight years since mid-2014. Lo Giudice's replacement, club director and former PriceWaterhouseCoopers CEO Luke Sayers, was announced in April with the pair to prepare for the transition during the year. As part of the transition, and in response to the club's weaker than expected start to the season, Lo Giudice commissioned a review of the club's football department, which was conducted by Sayers, CEO Cain Liddle, and external panel members Matthew Pavlich, Geoff Walsh and Graham Lowe, from which followed substantial changes to the club's administration and football department in 2021. Sayers officially took over on August 17, 2021, one round before the end of the season.

David Teague continued in his second full season as appointed senior coach, having also served a half-season as caretaker in 2019. The coaching panel was reduced in size as a result of seeking cost savings and meeting the AFL's soft spending cap due to the coronavirus pandemic, which saw head of coaching performance Henry Playfair, former Northern Blues senior head coach Josh Fraser, development coach Jason Davenport, and specialist coaches Saverio Rocca, Hamish McIntosh and Greg Williams were all made redundant. Added to the club's coaching panel in the new development role as leader of the Carlton College of Sport Development Program and Carlton Academy coach was former Western Jets and  development coach Torin Baker. Long serving assistant coach John Barker, who had also served as caretaker senior coach for part of the 2015 season, departed the club in June after 10½ years, a few months earlier than his originally planned departure at the end of the season.

Squad for 2021
The following is Carlton's squad for the 2021 season.

Statistics are correct as of end of 2020 season.
Flags represent the state of origin, i.e. the state in which the player played his Under-18s football.

For players: (c) denotes captain, (vc) denotes vice-captain, (dvc) denotes deputy vice-captain, (lg) denotes leadership group.
For coaches: (s) denotes senior coach, (cs) denotes caretaker senior coach, (a) denotes assistant coach, (d) denotes development coach, (m) denotes managerial or administrative role in a football or coaching department

Playing list changes
The following summarises all player changes which occurred after the 2020 season. Unless otherwise noted, draft picks refer to selections in the 2020 National Draft.

The club lost two of its four most experienced players to retirement at the end of 2020: Kade Simpson retired after 18 seasons and 342 games, the third most in club history; and Matthew Kreuzer retired after 13 seasons and 189 games, having missed all but the first match in 2020 with injury.

In

Out

List management

Season summary

Pre-season
The club played two full-length practice matches in the lead-up to the season. The match against St Kilda was scheduled as part of the 2021 AAMI Community Series, and the match against Essendon was arranged between the clubs and played behind closed doors but was live streamed on the club website.

Premiership season
Following improvements to 11th place under Teague in 2020, Carlton was expected to continue its improvement in 2021 and at the start of the season was considered an outside chance of playing finals. During the mid-season bye, the club's football department review was announced. The club still maintained a mathematical chance of making finals until Round 22, but ultimately finished 13th with an 8–14 record.

Carlton's formline was erratic. The club had a 0–9 record against the top seven teams. It was 4–2 against the teams placed between 8th and 12th, with its Round 7 win against eighth-placed Essendon serving as its highest placed defeated opponent for the year. Against teams placed 14th to 18th, Carlton's record was only 4–3, suffering one loss against each of the bottom three teams (and ).

Season

Individual awards

John Nicholls Medal
The Carlton Football Club Best and Fairest awards night took place on 14 October 2021, taking place as a virtual event due to COVID-19 lockdown restrictions.

John Nicholls Medal
The winner of the John Nicholls Medal was Sam Walsh, who polled 183 votes to win the award for the first time in his career. 2020 winner Jacob Weitering finished second, polling 172 votes; and Harry McKay finished third with 118 votes.

Other awards
The following other awards were presented on John Nicholls Medal night:-
Best Young Player – Liam Stocker
Best Clubman – Marc Pittonet
Spirit of Carlton Award – Jack Silvagni
Bill Lanyon Inner Blue Ruthless Award – Sam Walsh
Carltonians William A. Cook Award – Sam Walsh
Coaches' Award – Jacob Weitering
Most Valuable Bluebagger Award – Jacob Weitering

Leading goalkickers 
Harry McKay won both the Coleman Medal as the league's leading goalkicker in the home-and-away season, and Carlton's leading goalkicker, kicking 58 goals. His tally of 58 goals was the most by any Carlton player in a season since Brendan Fevola kicked 89 goals in 2009, which was also club's most recent previous Coleman Medal. It was McKay's first Coleman Medal, and was achieved despite playing only 19 of 22 games. He held a ten-goal lead when his season ended due to injury with two rounds remaining, and ultimately won by four goals from Tom Hawkins on 54 goals.

Small forwards Eddie Betts and Matthew Owies occupied the next two positions – the former in his final season, and the latter in his breakout season – followed by midfielders Patrick Cripps and Sam Walsh.

Other awards
Honorific teams
All-Australian team – two Carlton players – Sam Walsh and Harry McKay – were named in the 2021 All-Australian team, both receiving the honour for the first times in their careers. Jacob Weitering was also nominated in the 40-man squad, for the second consecutive year.
22under22 team – one Carlton player – Sam Walsh – was named in the 22under22 team for the 2021 season. It was Walsh's third selection, and Walsh was named captain of the team.

AFLCA awards
Midfield assistant coach Luke Power won the AFLCA Assistant Coach of the Year award.

Statistical leaders
Adam Saad led the league in running bounces for the season, with 63.

Club records
Round 22 – Marc Murphy played his 300th (and final) senior game for the club, becoming the sixth player to reach the milestone for Carlton.
Season - Jacob Weitering set a new club record for most rebounds in a season with 139.
Season – Sam Walsh polled 30 votes in the Brownlow Medal, tying Greg Williams (1994) and Chris Judd (2010) for the most in a season in club history; unlike Williams and Judd, who each won their respective year, Walsh finished fourth overall and polled the most votes ever by a fourth-placed finisher.

Hall of Fame
Four-time premiership player David McKay, who played for Carlton between 1969 and 1981, was elevated to the status of Legend in the Carlton Football Club Hall of Fame.

AFL Women's
Squad
Most significant among the list changes in the women's team for the 2021 season was the loss of foundation player Sarah Hosking to Richmond, and the acquisition of former Melbourne captain Elise O'Dea – both in trades. The club's highest draft pick, No. 12, went to the recruitment of Mimi Hill.

The club's 2021 squad is given below. The number of games played and goals scored in the 2021 season is given in parentheses.

Season
Despite starting the season as one of the premiership favourites, Carlton underperformed across the 2021 AFLW season to finish seventh with a 5–4 record to miss the top six. Although the team was still in contention for sixth place entering the final round, this relied on a heavy victory and other results falling Carlton's way, which did not occur. Across the entire season, Carlton was 0–4 against top eight clubs – including three losses by a goal or less, two of which occurred in the opening two rounds – and 5–0 against the bottom six.

Notable events
In Round 8 against Gold Coast, Carlton set a new record for the highest score by any team in an AFLW match, 13.9 (87); the score broke the Western Bulldogs' 2018 record of 12.14 (86), and stood until broken in Round 8, 2022. The 60-point winning margin and Darcy Vescio's five goals in the match both set records as the highest in Carlton's AFLW history.

League awards
Darcy Vescio was the winner of the league's leading goalkicker award, having kicked 16 goals during the home and away season. It was Vescio's second leading goalkicker medal, and their tally of 16 goals broke their own 2017 record of 14 goals in a season.
Two Carlton players were selected in the 21-player team for the All-Australian team: Darcy Vescio at full forward and Breann Moody in the ruck. Kerryn Harrington and Madison Prespakis were also part of the original 40-woman squad.

Club Awards
Darcy Vescio won the club's best and fairest award, polling 66 votes to finish ahead of Nicola Stevens (53 votes) and Kerryn Harrington (49 votes).
Jess Hosking won the coaches' award for demonstrating club values across the season.
Mimi Hill won the Best First Year Player award.

Reserves
Carlton fielded reserves teams in the men's and women's competitions during the 2021 season.

Men's
After having an eighteen season reserves alignment with the Northern Bullants\Blues club in the Victorian Football League, Carlton terminated the agreement in March 2020 as a cost-saving measure during the coronavirus pandemic. In 2021, the club re-established its own reserves team for the first time since 2002. The reserves team contested its fourth VFL season, having previously contested the 2000–2002 seasons; and its 85th overall season of reserves and state level competition dating back to 1919.

Daniel O'Keefe, who had joined the club as a development coach in 2020, took the role as the reserves coach. New players signed to the club's VFL list included former AFL players James Parsons, Ben Crocker (/) and Ryley Stoddart; former AFL-listed players Fraser Phillips, Tom North, Harry Reynolds (Sydney), Cody Hirst (Sydney), Will Golds and Toby Wooller (Brisbane); as well as Alex Cincotta, Daniel Guccione, Cooper Stephens, Stefan Radovanovic, Lachie Potter, Aaron Gundry, Lachie Bond, Edward Delany, Matt Shannon, Dale Marshall, Lachie Swaney, Ben Caluzzi, Lachlan Gawel, Owen King, Zane Barzen, Ben Nikolovski and Alex Mirkov, who was later added to the club's senior list during the mid-season draft. Stoddart and Shannon served as co-captains of the team.

In a planned sixteen-game season which was repeatedly interrupted and ultimately curtailed by COVID-19 pandemic-related lockdowns, the team played only nine home-and-away matches for a 4–5 record, finishing 12th out of 22 teams. Ben Crocker, who kicked 29 goals for the year, won the reserves' best and fairest.

Women's
The club fielded a team in the VFL Women's competition for the third time, after the competition's one-year hiatus in 2020 due to the pandemic. The scheduling of the competition shifted in 2021, now running concurrently with the AFL Women's season rather than after it, meaning that the team will function as a reserves team, rather than a senior team at state level. The team finished eighth out of twelve teams, with a win–loss record of 6–8 to miss the finals by one win and percentage.

References

Carlton Football Club seasons
Carlton
Carlton